"No Pigeons" is the second and final single by Sporty Thievz, released from their 1999 album Street Cinema. A rebuttal to TLC's smash hit single "No Scrubs", it received heavy radio play at the time of its release and peaked at #12 on the U.S. Billboard Hot 100, at about the same time the TLC single was enjoying a successful chart run.

Song information
"No Pigeons" was originally written & recorded by rap artist Mr. Wood$ alongside one of New York's highly respected  mix tape DJs, DJ Rhude. Both wanted to create a male-aimed response after the widespread international success of TLC's song "No Scrubs," which discusses the unwillingness of women to engage in a relationship with unemployed, grimy, unsophisticated, or poorly-mannered men. The song was then titled "No Vultures" and released independently via mix tape, which DJ Rhude was known for in the early-to-late 1990s.

"No Vultures" landed into the hands of WQHT/Hot 97's DJ & On Air Personality Funkmaster Flex, who quickly realized that the record would be a perfect hit for a group that he produced and mentored called Sporty Thievz. Flex quickly contacted Mr. Wood$ & DJ Rhude to re-record the record along with the Sporty Thievz to be released nationally under the name "No Pigeons" after taking a unanimous vote that a pigeon would work better commercially, as being called a "vulture" could potentially offend some female listeners.

Nationally released as "No Pigeons" by the Sporty Thievz featuring Mr. Wood$, the song discusses the dilemma that "No Scrubs" alluded to, but referring to women as "pigeons" instead of "scrubs". Throughout the song, the artists on the track make overt references to unsightly, substandard women, accusing them of wearing hair weaves, having "more than one baby father" and poor personal hygiene, receiving public assistance, and stripping "all week to go clubbing".

Produced by Kevin "She'kspere" Briggs, the entire song uses a slightly faster instrumental of the original "No Scrubs" (also produced by Briggs) with added bass.

In 2007, California indie band Brighten covered the song for a Warped Tour compilation album entitled "Yo! Indie Rocks Raps," which was never released via retail outlets but was available for purchase at tour stops. Several of the tracks from this project (except for "No Pigeons") were eventually re-released on the Fearless Records compilation album Punk Goes Crunk.

Music video
Shot in March 1999 and partially filmed in the Parkchester section of the Bronx, the video features female rapper Eve, Gang Starr's Guru, Ras Kass & Harlem World rapper Blinky Blink.

Charts and certifications

Weekly charts

Certifications

|}

References

1999 singles
Sporty Thievz songs
Answer songs
African-American gender relations in popular culture
Diss tracks
Songs written by Kevin "She'kspere" Briggs
Songs written by Kandi Burruss
1999 songs
Ruffhouse Records singles